King Huanhui of Han (Chinese: 韩桓惠王; pinyin: Hán Huánhuì Wáng) (died 239 BC), ancestral name Jì (姬), clan name Hán (韩), personal name unknown, was the ruler of the State of Han between 272 BC and until his death in 239 BC. He was the son of King Xi of Han. During his reign, Han Fei submitted numerous proposals to enact Legalism. In 246 BC, King Huanhui sent Zheng Guo west to Qin to construct a canal with the intention of wasting Qin's resources. The canal came to be known as Zhengguo Canal.

In the 55th year of King Nan of Zhou (262 BC), Qin sent Bai Qi to invade Han and took Yewang. To broker peace, King Huanhui ceded Shangdang Commandery to Qin. The people of Shangdang refused to be ruled by Qin but also lacked the military strength for defense. Shangdang's governor-general Feng Ting (冯亭) surrendered instead to Zhao. Zhao accepted the surrender and sent Lian Po to defend Changping; the Battle of Changping ensued.

King Huanhui died in 239 BC and was succeeded by his son King An of Han.

Ancestors

References

Shiji Chapter 45
Zizhi Tongjian Volume 4, 5, 6

239 BC deaths
Zhou dynasty nobility
Monarchs of Han (state)
Legalism (Chinese philosophy)
Year of birth unknown